Dixie County Middle High School is located at 17924 SE 19 HWY in Cross City, Florida, United States. It is a part of Dixie District Schools, which serves Dixie County.  The school changed its name in 2021 from Dixie County High School, due to the school now including grades 8–12. Students grades 6–7 in Dixie County are still taught at Ruth Raines Middle School.

The school's teams are known as the Bears and Lady Bears. Sports include: football, softball, basketball, baseball, weight lifting, and soccer.

Notable alumni include professional basketball player Eugene McDowell and football players Nick Collins (Green Bay Packers) and Duke Dawson (New England Patriots).

The school colors are red, black, and white.

Career technical programs—Health Sciences (Certified Nursing Assistant), Welding, Agriculture, Aeronautical, Biotech, Computer Science, and Digital Technology—offer students industry certification to prepare them for work after high school graduation.

The vision of Dixie County High School is to create a nurturing culture that strives to instill the desire in all students to become lifelong learners through a rigorous and relevant curriculum that prepares them for college, career, and success in a global society.

References

External links

 Dixie County High School

Public high schools in Florida
Dixie County, Florida